Resource Extraction Monitoring (REM) is a non-profit organisation that provides independent monitoring to ensure that laws relating to the extraction of natural resources are enforced. It was founded in 2003 by experts with over 15 years of monitoring experience.  The head office is in the UK, with local offices in countries where major projects are taking place.

The organisation bridges the gap between governments, environmental and human rights NGOs and local communities, donors and the private sector by providing objective and timely information on natural resource allocation and use. REM is not a lobbying organisation and has no political agenda, but is pro-active in researching and presenting the issue of governance and transparency during project implementation.

Activities

Resource Extraction Monitoring and partner organization, Forests Monitor, are monitoring forest exploitation in the Democratic Republic of the Congo (DRC). This project is now in its second phase. REM was appointed the Independent Monitor of Forest Law Enforcement and Governance in the DRC for a duration of 25 months, starting from December 2010.

The organisation also has projects in other countries, including:

Cameroon
Liberia
Republic of Congo
Sri Lanka
Tanzania

See also

Forests Monitor
Illegal logging
Independent Forest Monitoring

External links
An explanation of Independent Monitoring
Forests Monitor website
Reource Extraction Monitoring website
REM IM-FLEG Cameroon Website (French) 
REM IM-FLEG Republic of Congo Website (French)
REM IM-FLEG Democratic Republic of Congo Website (French)

Organizations established in 2003
Nature conservation organisations based in the United Kingdom
Non-profit organisations based in the United Kingdom
International forestry organizations
Forest certification
Forest law
Anti-corruption agencies